The Pegasus Booster is a British powered hang glider that was designed and produced by Pegasus Aviation.

Design and development
The booster was sold either as an engine package or as a powered hang gliding harness, to which the pilot could add any standard hang glider wing. When ready to fly the aircraft features a cable-braced hang glider-style high-wing, weight-shift controls, single-place accommodation, foot-launching and landing and a single engine in pusher configuration.

The aircraft uses a standard hang glider wing, made from bolted-together aluminium tubing, with its single surface wing covered in Dacron sailcloth. The wing is supported by a single tube-type kingpost and uses an "A" frame control bar.

Variants
Pegasus Booster
Version produced by Pegasus Aviation in the late 1990s period.
Solar Wings Booster Mk I
Version produced by Solar Wings in the early-2000s period. Was noted as being compatible with the Woody Valley harness that was popular in Europe in that time period.
Solar Wings Booster Mk II
Version produced by Solar Wings in the mid-2000s period. Was noted as being not compatible with the Woody Valley harness that was popular in Europe in that time period.

Specifications (Booster)

References

Pegasus Booster
1990s British ultralight aircraft
Single-engined pusher aircraft
Powered hang gliders